Hemu Kalani (23 March 1923 – 21 January 1943) was a revolutionary and freedom fighter during the Indian Independence Movement. He was a leader of Swaraj Sena, a student organisation which was affiliated with All India Students Federation (AISF). He was one of the youngest revolutionaries to be martyred for the nation's freedom struggle, being executed by the British colonial authorities when he was only 19, two months before his 20th birthday.

Early life
Hemu Kalani was born in a Sindhi Jain family at Sukkur in Sind Division of Bombay Presidency in British India (now in Pakistan) on 23 March 1923. (His birthday coincides with the day Bhagat Singh, Sukhdev & Rajguru were hanged).  He was born in a Jain family residing in Sindh and he was son of Pesumal Kalani and Jethi Bai. As a child and young man he campaigned with his friends for boycotts of foreign goods and tried to persuade people to use Swadeshi goods. He was drawn to revolutionary activities and started participating in acts of protests with the aim of driving out the British. He was involved in raids and in the burning of vehicles belonging to the British government.

Freedom struggle

Hemu Kalani joined Mahatma Gandhi's Quit India movement when it was started in 1942. Support for the movement in Sindh was such that the British colonial authorities had to send military detachments after him consisting of European battalions. Hemu Kalani found out that a train of these troops and their supplies would be passing through his local town on 23 October and decided to derail it by removing the fishplates from the railway track. This despite the fact that neither he nor his colleagues had the necessary tools and so had to use a rope as a means to loosen the fixings.

They were seen by the British before being able to complete the sabotage. Hemu was caught, imprisoned, and tortured by the Indian Imperial Police in an attempt to get him to reveal the names of his co-conspirators. He refused to divulge any information, was put on trial and sentenced to death. The people of Sindh petitioned the Viceroy for mercy but the condition of granting it was that the authorities must be told the identity of his co-conspirators. He again refused to pass on the information and he was hanged on 21 January 1943.

It is said that Hemu Kalani was so happy upon being handed the death sentence that, contrary to usual, he gained a good deal of weight during the time between his sentencing and his execution.  On the day of his execution, he appeared extremely overjoyed, and walked to the gallows with a copy of the Bhagavad Gita in his hands, smiling and humming the whole way.

Legacy

India
 Statue instituted of Hemu Kalani at Hemu Kalani Square Jaripatka, Nagpur, Maharashtra.
 Sant hirdaram nagar (Bairagarh) Bhopal
Statue, institutions and many more name of the shaheed hemu kalani

 Agra city in U.P.
Hemu Kalani Statue near Sadar Tehsil, Hemu Kalani road, Agra
erected Statue by Agra Sindhi Samaj & Hemu Kalani Murti Sthapana Samiti, Agra
 Adipur city in Kutch, Gujarat, has also Hemu Kalani Statue near Gandhi Samadhi, Maitri School road
 Bhilwara city, In  Sindhunagar Colony has erected Statue of Shaheed Hemu Kalani at the crossing of the road (chowk). Called Hemu Kalani Circle.
 Tonk city (Rajasthan) has erected a statue of Young Martyr Hemu Kalani at the Sawai Madhopur Circle
 Ahmedabad city (Gujarat) has erected Statue of Amar Shaheed Shree Hemu Kalani at the Rajavir Circle
 Indore city has named a road intersection after Hemu Kalani and placed his statue at the center of the intersection
 Faizabad city has named a National Parks in His Name and a Faizabad to Ayodhya HWY A National Libraries in Ayodhya
 A statue of Hemu Kalani is located in the Parliament complex in front of the Deputy Speaker's office
 Chembur, a suburb of Mumbai with a large Sindhi population, has Hemu Kalani Marg named after the famous freedom fighter
 In Ulhasnagarhas erected Statue of Shaheed Hemu Kalani at the crossing of the road (chowk)
 Jodhpur city (Rajasthan) has named a road intersection after Hemu Kalani and placed his statue at the center of the intersection
 Ajmer city (Rajasthan) has erected Statue of Shaheed Hemu Kalani at the Diggi Bazar Chowk
 Ajmer city (Rajasthan) has a locality in Lakhan Kothri called Hemu Kalani Mohalla
 Delhi city (Lajpat Nagar), located a senior secondary school named Shaheed Hemu Kalani Sarvodaya Bal Vidyalaya
Delhi city (Pitampura), Veer Hemu Marg and a street named "shaheed hemu kalani marg" In old Rajendra Nagar, Karol Bag, New Delhi
 Kanpur city, has a park named Hemu Kalani park located in the Sindhi Colony area named after Shaheed Hemu Kalani
 Kota city, has a community hall Hemu Kalani Samudayik Bhawan located in the Sahjidera area named after Shaheed Hemu Kalani
 Dhule city in Maharashtra has Shaheed Hemu Kalani Road
 Amalner city in Maharashtra has Shaheed Hemu Kalani Road
 Pimpri-Chinchwad  city in Maharashtra has a children's park named Hemu Kalani Garden and society named Hemu Kalani Housing Society located in Pimpri
 Bhilwara city in Rajasthan has a Road Square in Sindhu Nagar named as Hemu Kalani Chowk
 Bilaspur city in Chhattisgarh has a locality named after him called Hemu Nagar
 Neemuch city in Madhya Pradesh has a Road Square named Hemu Kalani Chowk with an erected Statue of Shaheed Hemu Kalani
 Bikaner city (Rajasthan) has named a road intersection after Hemu Kalani and placed his statue at the center of the intersection
A poem " Hemu Kalani"  was written on 25 January 1943 by Indra Bahadur Khare, just 4 days after Hemu's hanging, and it is published in 2017 after a span of 74 years
 The Raipur city of Chhattisgarh has a square in the main street called Hemu Kalani Chowk
Shaheed Hemu Kalani education society is run in Sant Hirdaram Nagar Bhopal
Raipur city of Chhattisgarh has a Community Hall near Lakhe Nagar Area called Amar Shaheed Hemu Kalani Bhawan
Korba city of Chhattisgarh has a Big community hall near the Rani Road area called Amar Shaheed Hemu Kalani Dharamshala
Bhavnagar city in Gujarat has a Road Square at Gopal Park in Sindhunagar has erected Statue of Amar Shaheed Hemu Kalani at the crossing of the road (chowk) named as Hemu Kalani Circle on 21 January 2020
Chittorgarh, Rajasthan has an intersection named after Shaheed Hemu Kalani Chauraha which was previously known as Pratap Nagar Chauraha.
 Jalgaon, Maharashtra has a garden, Park Named "Hemu Kalani Bagicha" behind Sindhi Colony, Kanwar Nagar, Near Joshi Colony, Jalgaon-425001
 [Belagavi] Hemi Kalani chowk near Daak bungalow, a circle  named
 Ujjain, M.P. Statue of Hemu Kalani erected at Park Named "Choithram Gidwani Udyan" , Situated at Sindhi Colony, Sanwer Road, Freeganj, UJJAIN (M.P.)-456001

Sindh
 Hemu Kalani Park, Sukkur – was later renamed to Qasim Park.

References

External links

Sindhi people
Sindhi warriors
Indian revolutionaries
Executed Indian people
People executed by British India by hanging
1923 births
1943 deaths
People from Sukkur District